Pak Ui-myong (born 20 August 1968) is a North Korean weightlifter. He competed in the men's middleweight event at the 1992 Summer Olympics.

References

1968 births
Living people
North Korean male weightlifters
Olympic weightlifters of North Korea
Weightlifters at the 1992 Summer Olympics
Place of birth missing (living people)
Asian Games medalists in weightlifting
Weightlifters at the 1990 Asian Games
Asian Games silver medalists for North Korea
Medalists at the 1990 Asian Games
21st-century North Korean people
20th-century North Korean people